Helen Dryden (1882–1972) was an American artist and successful industrial designer in the 1920s and 1930s. She was reportedly described by The New York Times as being the highest-paid woman artist in the United States, though she lived in comparative poverty in later years.

Education 
Dryden was born in Baltimore and moved to Pittsburgh when she was seven years old to attend Eden Hall. During her early childhood years Dryden showed unusual artistic ability, designing and selling clothes for paper dolls. Eventually she sold a set of her paper dolls and dresses to a newspaper for use in its fashion section. This in turn led to a position as illustrator for Anne Rittenhouse's fashion articles in the Philadelphia Public Ledger and The Philadelphia Press.

Dryden was largely self-trained, describing her works as "a combination of things I like, in the way I want to do them." Her artistic education consisted of four years of training in landscape painting under Hugh Breckinridge and one summer school session at the Pennsylvania Academy of Fine Arts. Deciding that she had no real interest in landscape painting, Dryden focused her complete attention on fashion design and illustration.

Career

Fashion illustration 
After moving to New York in 1909, Dryden spent a year trying to interest fashion magazines in her drawings. None, however, showed any interest in her work and many were harsh with criticism. Dryden was particularly disappointed in her rejection by Vogue. Less than a year later, however, Condé Nast Publications assumed management of Vogue and set out to make changes. Upon seeing Dryden's drawings, they directed the fashion editor to contact her immediately. The result was a Vogue contract that led to a 13-year collaboration (1909–1922) during which she produced many fashion illustrations and magazine covers. Her "essentially romantic style produced some of the most appealing, yet fantastical images on Vogue covers, frequently depicting imagined rather than realistic representations of dress." She also illustrated other Condé Nast titles, including Vanity Fair and House and Garden.

Costume design 
In addition to her prolific career as an illustrator, in 1914 Dryden launched a successful career as a costume designer. She designed scenery and costumes for the musical comedy Watch Your Step, followed by designs for several other stage plays including Clair de Lune, the fanciful drama based loosely on a Victor Hugo romance. Although the play starred Lionel and Ethel Barrymore, Helen Dryden's costume designs were generally given equal credit for the play's success.

Industrial design 
Following the 1925 Paris Exposition Internationale des Arts Décoratifs et Industriels Modernes, Dryden turned her attention to industrial design, producing a number of designs for tableware, lamps, and other housewares, for the Revere Corporation. She had a highly paid job with the Dura Company until the stock market crash of 1929, at which point she was replaced by George W. Walker. It seems Dryden never fully recovered from this blow. According to Christopher Gray, "The 1925 census recorded her living at 9 East 10th Street with her 25-year-old Philippine-born cook and butler, Ricardo Lampitok."

Dryden worked for Studebaker from 1935 to 1938, reportedly earning $100,000 per year ($ in  dollars ). Automotive designer Raymond Loewy contracted with her to help him design Studebaker interiors. Her work on the interior of the 1936 Studebaker Dictator and President that established Helen Dryden as an important twentieth-century industrial designer. The advertisements by the automaker proclaimed, "It's styled by Helen Dryden." Dryden designed the Studebaker President throughout, and the press marveled that a woman had attained this eminence in mechanical engineering. She was considered "one of the top industrial designers and one of the few women in the automotive field." Dryden worked with Loewy through 1940.

By 1956 Dryden was again living in a $10-a-week hotel room paid for by the city's Welfare Department. At the time, she referred nostalgically to "her '$200-a-month' 10th Street apartment".

References

External links

1880s births
1972 deaths
American industrial designers
Fashion illustrators